Malena Riskevich Nunes is a Brazilian YouTuber and digital influencer (born 2 February 1995). She is known for her gameplay videos.

References 

1995 births
Living people
Brazilian YouTubers
Brazilian lesbians
LGBT YouTubers
21st-century Brazilian LGBT people